Tony Dempsey (born 11 May 1944) is an Irish former Fianna Fáil politician. He was a Teachta Dála (TD) for the Wexford constituency from 2002 to 2007.

Dempsey is a native of Davidstown, County Wexford and was educated at Enniscorthy Christian Brothers School, University College Dublin and St. Patrick's College, Maynooth. Prior to entering politics he worked as a secondary schoolteacher, and was a principal teacher of a large secondary school in Enniscorthy at the time of his election.

He was always widely known for his involvement with Gaelic games in County Wexford. He had been appointed chairman of Wexford County Board (the governing body of the Gaelic Athletic Association in the county) in 1976 at the age of 35, becoming one of the youngest ever persons to hold the position, and he had been involved with inter-county hurling and Gaelic football teams in Wexford either as a trainer, selector or manager. He trained the Wexford Junior Gaelic football team to a Leinster championship in 2000 when they defeated Dublin in the final. At the time of his election, he was manager of the Wexford senior hurling team.

Dempsey was elected to Dáil Éireann at the 2002 general election. This was the first time that he had stood for election at any level. He had been chosen as a candidate in the hope of increasing Fianna Fáil's vote and obtaining three seats out of five in the constituency for the party. However, the strategy was unsuccessful and while he was elected, it was at the expense of a party colleague, Hugh Byrne. Dempsey did not contest the 2007 general election. He was elected to Wexford County Council at the 2009 local elections and re-elected at the 2014 local elections. He retired at the 2019 local elections.

References

External links
Tony Dempsey's page on the Fianna Fáil website

 

 

1944 births
Living people
Alumni of St Patrick's College, Maynooth
Alumni of University College Dublin
Chairmen of county boards of the Gaelic Athletic Association
Fianna Fáil TDs
Heads of schools in Ireland
Hurling managers
Irish schoolteachers
Irish sportsperson-politicians
Local councillors in County Wexford
Members of the 29th Dáil
Politicians from County Wexford
Wexford County Board administrators